The 1984 du Maurier Classic was contested from July 26–29 at St. George's Golf and Country Club. It was the 12th edition of the du Maurier Classic, and the sixth edition as a major championship on the LPGA Tour.

This event was won by Juli Inkster.

Final leaderboard

External links
 Golf Observer source

Canadian Women's Open
Sports competitions in Toronto
du Maurier Classic
du Maurier Classic
du Maurier Classic